Polizeifunk ruft is a German television series. It was filmed in Hamburg.

See also
List of German television series

External links
 

German crime television series
1960s German police procedural television series
Television shows set in Hamburg
1960s German television series
1966 German television series debuts
1970 German television series endings
Sequel television series
German-language television shows
Das Erste original programming